Laila Peak in the Haramosh Valley, (near Chogolungma Glacier) is  high. It was first climbed by the Hekiryou Alpine Club of Japan on 9 August 1975.


See also 
 Gilgit-Baltistan
 Highest Mountains of the World

References

External links 
 Northern Pakistan detailed placemarks in Google Earth
 

Six-thousanders of the Karakoram
Mountains of Gilgit-Baltistan